"E Raffaella è mia" ("And Raffaella Is Mine") is a single by Tiziano Ferro, the fourth to be released from his 2006 album Nessuno è solo. The single was released during the summer of 2007, and is a tribute to the Italian showgirl Raffaella Carrà. Carrà not only participated in the music video, but also performed at his concert at PalaLottomatica in a duet. The single was also released in Spain, where Carrà was particularly appreciated.

Versions 

 E Raffaella è mia
 E Raffaella è mia (Paolo Aliberti Melodica Moody Edit Mix)
 E Raffaella è mia (Paolo Aliberti Melodica Moody Mix)
 E Raffaella è mia (Psychi Radio Remix)
 Y Raffaella es mía

Music video 
The video begins with images of a fake music television program, vaguely reminiscent of the 60s, called Il mondo di Raffaella ("Raffaella's World"). The presenter of the show, played by Ferro, presents a 'young' singer (again Ferro) who sings the song. The video then cuts to a young male's home (again Ferro), who is watching the transmission enthusiastically. Midway though, the presenter reappears to announce the winner of a competition to spend an evening with Raffaella Carrà ("The lucky winner is: Ferro, Tiziano!"). The young viewer jumps up and down, whilst the door opens halfway to reveal Carrà. The video continues with Ferro singing the song and dancing with Carrà, whilst the viewer is at home playing with Carrà, in a surreal dreamlike atmosphere.

Charts

Certifications

References

2007 singles
Tiziano Ferro songs
2006 songs
EMI Records singles
Songs written by Tiziano Ferro